Euspira heros, the northern moon snail, is a species of large sea snail in the family Naticidae. This large snail is rather uncommon intertidally, but is much more common subtidally. This species, like all moon snails, feeds voraciously on clams and other snails.

Description

The operculum is large, ear-shaped in outline, and is corneous and somewhat transparent. On beaches where the shell of this species washed up commonly, the operculum will usually also be found washed up in the drift line.

Distribution
The distribution of Euspira heros falls within the range: 51.5°N to 33°N; 76°W to 65°W. This western Atlantic species occurs in:
 Canada: Labrador, Gulf of St. Lawrence, Quebec, Nova Scotia, New Brunswick
 USA: Massachusetts, Connecticut, New York, New Jersey, New Hampshire, Delaware, Maryland, Virginia, North Carolina, Maine

There is a sibling species on the Pacific coast of North America: Neverita lewisii.

Habitat
Euspira heros lives on sand substrates in infralittoral, and circalittoral parts and estuary.

It has been found at the surface to depths up to

Predation
Empty shells of clams and snails, including other moon snails, display evidence of predation by a moon snail when they are seen to have a neat "countersunk" hole drilled in them.

The powerful foot enables this gastropod to plow under the sand in search of other mollusks. Upon finding one, it "drills" a hole into the shell with its radula, releases digestive enzymes, and sucks out the somewhat predigested contents.

References

 Gosner, K.L. 1971. Guide to identification of marine and estuarine invertebrates: Cape Hatteras to the Bay of Fundy. John Wiley & Sons, Inc. 693 p
 Abbott, R.T. (1974). American Seashells. 2nd ed. Van Nostrand Reinhold: New York, NY (USA). 663 pp
 Linkletter, L.E. 1977. A checklist of marine fauna and flora of the Bay of Fundy. Huntsman Marine Laboratory, St. Andrews, N.B. 68 p.
 Bromley, J.E.C., and J.S. Bleakney. 1984. Keys to the fauna and flora of Minas Basin. National Research Council of Canada Report 24119. 366 p
 Brunel, P., L. Bosse, and G. Lamarche. 1998. Catalogue of the marine invertebrates of the estuary and Gulf of St. Lawrence. Canadian Special Publication of Fisheries and Aquatic Sciences, 126. 405 p
 Trott, T.J. 2004. Cobscook Bay inventory: a historical checklist of marine invertebrates spanning 162 years. Northeastern Naturalist (Special Issue 2): 261 - 324.

External links
  Eco Field Guide: Northern moon snail
  Moon snails in butter

Naticidae
Gastropods described in 1822